The Committee for Peace and Security in the Gulf (CPSG) was a "bipartisan group whose members are prominent in U.S. international policy circles.... The 39-member group, organized as the Committee for Peace and Security in the Gulf, included former U.S. Rep. Stephen Solarz of New York, who was a member of the House Foreign Affairs Committee and Richard Perle, a former assistant defense secretary for international security policy." 

Other members included Tony Coelho, Ann Lewis, Robert G. Torricelli, Richard G. Lugar, Howard H. Baker Jr., Frank C. Carlucci, and Jeane J. Kirkpatrick.

Open Letter to President Clinton
In February 1998, in an open letter the CPSG asked U.S. President Bill Clinton "to go beyond a military strike on Iraq and to help overthrow Iraqi President Saddam Hussein and replace his regime with a provisional government." According to the news report, however, "U.S. law and international opposition to such a plan would make it unlikely."

The group based its request for a strike against Iraq on Saddam Hussein's refusal "to grant U.N. inspectors the right to conduct unfettered inspections of those sites where he is suspected of storing his still significant arsenal of chemical and biological munitions and his apparent determination never to relinquish his weapons of mass destruction." In a letter read at a Washington news conference, Solarz called upon Clinton "to adopt and implement a plan of action designed to finally and fully resolve this utterly unacceptable threat to our most vital national interests."

Additionally, Solarz stated that "if the force used against Iraq during the 1991 Persian Gulf War and the punishing U.N. economic sanctions that have been in place for seven years haven't persuaded Hussein to cooperate with U.N. inspectors, it's unlikely that a new and 'much more limited' military strike will change the Iraqi leader's mind."

See also

Citizens for a Free Kuwait
Committee for the Liberation of Iraq
Committee on the Present Danger
Institute for Religion and Democracy
Project for the New American Century

References

External links
Committee for Peace and Security in the Gulf Open Letter to the President, 19 February 1998

Iraq and weapons of mass destruction
Political organizations based in the United States
Iraq–United States relations